Shelton House may refer to:

Shelton-Lockeby House, Murfreesboro, AR, listed on the NRHP in Arkansas
Shelton-Rich Farmstead, Webb City, AR, listed on the NRHP in Arkansas
William Shelton House, Windsor, CT, listed on the NRHP in Connecticut
David Shelton House, Talbotton, GA, listed on the NRHP in Georgia
Shelton House (Raymond, Mississippi), listed on the NRHP in Mississippi
Shelton Plantation House, Edenton, NC, listed on the NRHP in North Carolina
Shelton House (Waynesville, North Carolina), listed on the NRHP in North Carolina
Shelton-McMurphey House and Grounds, Eugene, OR, listed on the NRHP in Oregon
Shelton-Houghton House, Amarillo, TX, listed on the NRHP in Texas
William and Mary Shelton Farmstead, Seven Mile Creek, WI, listed on the NRHP in Wisconsin